Ashdod ( ʾašdōḏ;  ʾisdūd or ʾasdūd ; Philistine: 𐤀𐤔𐤃𐤃 *ʾašdūd) is the sixth-largest city in Israel.

The historical town of Ashdod, c.6 km southeast of the center of the modern town, dating to the 17th century BCE, was one of the five Philistine city-states. The coastal site of Ashdod-Yam, today southwest of the modern city, was a separate city for most of its history.

Modern Ashdod was established in 1956 on the sand hills 6km northeast of the historical Ashdod, then known as Isdud, a Palestinian town which had been depopulated in 1948. Being a planned city, expansion followed a main development plan, which facilitated traffic and prevented air pollution in the residential areas, despite population growth.

Ashdod is today a major Israeli city, and contains the largest port in Israel accounting for 60% of the country's imported goods. Ashdod today is home to the largest Moroccan and Karaite Jewish communities in Israel, and to the largest Georgian Jewish community in the world. It is also an important regional industrial center.

History

Stone Age
Three stone tools dating from the Neolithic era were discovered, but no other evidence of a Stone Age settlement in Ashdod was found, suggesting that the tools were deposited there in a later period.

Historical Ashdod (Isdud) and Ashdod-Yam

The historical town of Ashdod (today referred to as Tel Ashdod / Isdud), was c.6km southeast of the center of the modern town. It dates to the 17th century BCE, and was a prominent Philistine city, one of the five Philistine city-states. The coastal site of Ashdod-Yam, today southwest of the modern city, was a separate city for most of its history.

The first documented urban settlement at Tel Ashdod / Isdud dates to the 17th century BCE, when it was a fortified Canaanite city. It was destroyed at the end of the Late Bronze Age. During the Iron Age, it was a prominent Philistine city, one of the five Philistine city-states. It is mentioned 13 times in the Hebrew Bible. After being captured by Uzziah, it was briefly ruled by the Kingdom of Judah before it was taken by the Assyrians. During the Persian period, Nehemiah condemned the returning Jews for intermarrying Ashdod's residents. Under Hellenistic rule, the city was known as Azotus. It was later incorporated into the Hasmonean kingdom. During the 1st century BCE, Pompey removed the city from Judean rule and annexed it to the Roman province of Syria. Ashdod was a bishopric under Byzantine rule, but its importance gradually slipped and by the Middle Ages it was a village. 

Ashdod-Yam, later known as Azotos Paralios, appears to have been first settled in the Bronze Age, gradually gaining in importance through the Iron Age. In the Byzantine period the port town overshadowed in importance the city further inland: the bishops of Azotos present at the council of 325 and the council of Jerusalem in 536 seem to have resided in Azotos Paralios rather than in Azotos Mesogeios. The prominence of Hellenised, then Christian Azotus continued until the 7th century, when it came under Muslim rule. The city was represented at the Council of Chalcedon by Heraclius of Azotus. A coastal fort "Minat al-Qal'a" (lit. "the port with the castle" in Arabic) was erected by the Umayyad Caliph Abd al-Malik, the builder of the Dome of the Rock, at or near the former Azotus Paralios, which was later reconstructed by the Fatimids and Crusaders. The port city stops being mentioned during the Ayyubid and Mamluk periods, making it likely that it was destroyed due to fears that they might again be used by Crusader invasions from the sea.

Foundation of modern Ashdod

The modern city of Ashdod was founded in 1956. On May 1, 1956, then finance minister Levi Eshkol approved the establishment of the city of Ashdod. "Ashdod Company Ltd.", a daughter company of City-Builders Company Ltd., was created for that purpose by Oved Ben-Ami and Philip Klutznick.
The first settlers, 22 families from Morocco, arrived in November 1956, followed by a small influx of immigrants from Egypt. The building of the Eshkol A power station in Ashdod was completed in 1958 and included 3 units: 2 units of 50 megawatt, and one unit of 45 megawatt (with sea water desalination capabilities).

The city's development was made possible by the large investment of industrialist Israel Rogosin who opened his main Israeli factory in the city of Ashdod on August 9, 1960. Three of the high schools he funded were also built in Ashdod. The Main boulevard in Ashdod is named in his honour as a founder of the city.

The first local council was appointed in October 1959. Dov Gur was appointed the first local council head on behalf of the Israeli Ministry of Interior. In 1961, Ashdod was a town of 4,600. The Magistrates' Court in the city was inaugurated in 1963. The building of the port of Ashdod began in April 1961. The port was inaugurated in November 1963, and was first utilized in November 1965, with the coming of the Swedish ship "Wiengelgad". The city expanded gradually, with the construction of two quarters in the 1960s, followed by four more in the 1970s and two more in the 1980s. In 1972, the population was 40,300, and this grew to 65,700 by 1983.

Large-scale growth of the city began in 1991, with the massive arrival of immigrants from the Soviet Union and Ethiopia and infrastructure development. From 1990 to 2001 the city accepted more than 100,000 new inhabitants, a 150% growth. Five more quarters of the city were completed,  and a business district was built. In the 2000s, three more quarters and the marina districts were completed.

Ashdod was one of six cities that won the 2012 Education Prize awarded by the Israel Ministry of Education.

Urban development 

The modern city of Ashdod city was built outside the historic settlement site, on virgin sands. The development followed a main development plan. The planners divided the city into seventeen neighborhoods of ten to fifteen thousand people. Wide avenues between the neighborhoods make traffic flow relatively freely inside the city. Each neighborhood has access to its own commercial center, urban park, and health and education infrastructure. The original plan also called for a business and administrative center, built in the mid-1990s, when the city population grew rapidly more than doubling in ten years.

Three industrial zones were placed adjacent to the port in the northern part of the city, taking into account the prevailing southern winds which take air pollution away from the city. The plan had its problems, however, including asymmetric growth of upscale and poorer neighborhoods and the long-time lack of a main business and administrative center.

The city was planned for a maximum of 250,000 inhabitants, and an additional area in the south was reserved for further development.

In 2012, a plan to build an industrial zone on part of the Ashdod Sand Dune was approved. The plan calls for a hi-tech industrial park, events halls, and coffee shops to be built adjacent to the train station. It will cover , including 130 dunams of built-up space, with the rest of the area being preserved as a nature reserve. In addition, the Port of Ashdod is undergoing a massive expansion program.

Geography
The Ashdod-Nitzanim sand dune nature reserve is a  stretch of sand dunes on the southern outskirts of Ashdod.

Climate 
Ashdod has a Mediterranean climate with hot summers, pleasant spring and fall, and cool, rainy winters. As a seaside town, the humidity tends to be high many times year round, and rain occurs mainly from November to March.

Economy 

Ashdod is one of the most important industrial centers in Israel. All industrial activities in the city are located in northern areas such as the port area, the northern industrial zone, and around the Lachish River. The port of Ashdod is the largest port in Israel, handling about 60% of Israel's port cargo. It was mainly upgraded in recent years and will be able to provide berths for Panamax ships. Various shipping companies offices are also located in the port area which also is home to an Eshkol A power station and coal terminal.

The Northern industrial zone is located on Highway 41 and includes various industry including an oil refinery, which is one of only two in the country. The heavy industry zone located south of the Lachish River was once the main industrial center in Ashdod. Recently, however, leisure facilities have moved into the area. There is still some industry here, however, such as a Teva Pharmaceutical Industries plant, construction components producer Ashtrom, and Solbar a soybean oil producer. Ashdod is also home to Elta, a part of Israel Aircraft Industries where radar equipment, electronic warfare systems, and ELINT are developed.

Retail and entertainment

Historically each neighborhood of Ashdod had its own commercial center. In 1990, however, when the mall shopping culture developed in Israel, the main commercial activity in Ashdod moved to malls. The first mall to open in Ashdod was the Forum Center in the industrial zone. Restaurants, bars and night clubs were opened in the area. Today, the Forum center is mainly used for offices. Lev Ashdod Mall, which opened in 1993, has been enlarged and upgraded since then. Ashdod Mall, billed at the time as the city's largest shopping mall, has also been redesigned since its opening in 1995. City Mall, Ashdod was opened in a combined building with the central bus station in 1996, following the examples of the Tel Aviv Central Bus Station and the Jerusalem Central Bus Station. The Sea Mall, a three-story mall near the government offices, has a climbing wall and movie theater. Star Center doubled in size in 2007.

Education
In 2013, Ashdod had 500 schools employing 3,500 teachers. The student population was 55,000. The city's education budget was NIS 418 million shekels.

Lycée français Guivat-Washington, a French international high school, is in Givat Washington, in proximity to Ashdod.

Healthcare

Assuta Ashdod Medical Center, Ashdod's only general hospital, serves the city and the surrounding area. It is a 300-bed hospital, and its "bomb shelter" design with thick concrete walls offers sufficient protection so as to keep operating without having to transfer patients during a time of war. It is also a university hospital affiliated with Ben-Gurion University of the Negev. The hospital opened in 2017. Prior to the opening of the hospital, Ashdod did not have a general hospital, and residents in need of hospitalization had to travel to Kaplan Medical Center in Rehovot or Barzilai Medical Center in Ashkelon.

There are public and private clinics operating in the city. A special clinic run by Hatzalah operates at times when all other clinics in the city are closed.

Transportation

Road
Ashdod is located on the historic Via Maris. Highway 4 was developed following this route along the southern sea shore of Israel; it serves as the main connection to the north, towards the Tel Aviv metropolitan area, and to the south, towards Ashkelon. Ad Halom junction was planned as the main entrance to the city from the east.

Ashdod Interchange was opened in 2009.
The interchange continues the freeway section of Highway 4 further south, by removing the traffic light at this junction, and also added grade separation with the railway. The other main road in the area is Highway 41 which served the city from the start of its modern history. This road runs from west to east towards Gedera and it is the main transport link to the port of Ashdod and the industrial zones, and connects to Highway 4 with an interchange.

In late 2012, Ashdod won a NIS 220 million grant from the Israeli Transport Ministry to improve public transportation and decrease private car use. According to the municipality's plans, a 20-kilometer ring of road arteries will be given priority in public transportation. These arteries will carry four bus rapid transit lines. In the city's more crowded areas, such as Herzl Boulevard or the western part of Menachem Begin Boulevard, a public transportation lane will be paved in the center of the road. In other areas, the right-hand lane will be reserved for public transportation. Buses will also be given priority at traffic lights; electronic devices will allow a bus to signal its approach, causing the light to turn green.

Train 

The passenger railway connection to Ashdod opened in 1992 after the renovation of the historical railway to Egypt. Ashdod railway station is on Israel Railways' Binyamina/Netanya – Tel Aviv – Ashkelon line and it is located near Ad Halom Junction. The station was upgraded in 2003 when a new terminal building was built. The station building is modern, but proper road access to it was only organized on September 23, 2008, when a new road to the station was opened.

There is also heavy freight traffic in the area. Port of Ashdod has its own railway spur line as well as a special terminal for potash brought from the Sodom area and exported abroad.

Buses 
A new central bus station opened in 1996. It serves as the terminus both for inter- and intracity lines. The central bus station is attached to the City Mall. Intercity bus lines connect the city with most population centers in central and southern Israel. Following is the list of bus companies serving routes at the central bus station:

The Egged Ta'avura company has been operating urban buses in Ashdod since 2007. In addition, a share taxi service exists in Ashdod, operated by Moniyot HaIr. Most share taxi lines coincide with intracity bus lines.

Cruise ships and yachts

There is a passenger pier in the Port of Ashdod. The traffic at this gateway is constantly growing, especially due to cruise ship activities. The other sea gateway is Blue Marina.

Demographics 

The annual population growth rate is 2.6% and the ratio of women to men is 1,046 to 1,000. The population age distribution was recorded as 19.7% under the age of 10, 15.7% from age 10 to 19, 14.9% from 20 to 29, 19.1% from 30 to 44, 19.1% from 45 to 64, and 11.3% were 65 or older. The population of Ashdod is significantly younger than the Israeli average because of the large number of young couples living in the city. The city is ranked medium-low in socio-economic grading, with a rating of 4 out of 10. 56.1% of 12th grade students in Ashdod were eligible for matriculation certificates in 2000. The average salary in 2000 was NIS 4,821 compared to the national average of NIS 6,835.

Immigrant absorption
Ashdod has seen much of its growth as the result of absorption of immigrants. The first settlers were Jewish immigrants from Morocco and Egypt. In the 1960s Ashdod accepted a large number of immigrants from Romania, followed by a large number from Georgia (then part of the Soviet Union) in the 1970s. More than 60,000 Russian Jews from the former Soviet Union who immigrated to Israel in the 1990s following the collapse of the Soviet Union settled in Ashdod. Recent demographic figures suggest that about 32% of the city's population are new immigrants, 85% of whom are originally from the former Soviet Union. During the 1990s the city absorbed a large number of Beta Israel immigrants from Ethiopia, and in more recent years Ashdod absorbed a large number of immigrants from the United States, United Kingdom, France, Argentina, and South Africa. Many of the 60,000 Marathi-speaking Bene Israel from Maharashtra, India who moved to Israel also settled there. Ashdod also receives a significant amount of internal migration, especially from the Gush Dan region.

Religion

Over 95% of Ashdod's population is Jewish, over 30% of whom are religiously observant. Despite this, the city is generally secular, although most of the non-Jewish population is a result of mixed marriages. About 100 families are affiliated with the Pittsburg Hasidic group, established there in 1969 by Grand Rabbi Avraham Abba Leifer and continued today by his son, Grand Rabbi Mordechai Yissachar Ber Leifer. Ashdod has many synagogues serving different streams of Judaism. The city is also home to the world's largest Karaite community, about five thousand strong. There is also a Scandinavian Seamen Protestant church, established by Norwegian Righteous Among the Nations pastor Per Faye-Hansen.

Local government 

Ashdod was declared a city in 1968. The Ashdod City Council has twenty-five elected members, one of whom is the mayor. The mayor serves a five-year term and appoints six deputies. The current mayor of Ashdod, Yehiel Lasri, was last elected in 2008 after Zvi Zilker 
has been in office continuously since 1989. Within the city council there are various factions representing different population groups. The headquarters of the Ashdod Municipality and the mayor's office are at city hall. This new municipal building is located in the main culture and business area.

Mayors 

 Dov Gur (1959–61)
 Robert Hayim (1961–63)
 Avner Garin (1963–69)
 Zvi Zilker (1969–83)
 Aryeh Azulay (1983–89)
 Zvi Zilker (1989–2008)
 Yehiel Lasri (2008–)

Culture and art

Music and performing arts

Ashdod is home to the Israeli Andalusian Orchestra, which performs Andalusian classical music. It is an Arabic music style that originates from Moorish Iberia or Al-Andalus, has been jealously preserved in its original form by Arab and Jewish musicians of the Maghreb over the centuries, and has left its mark on the cante flamenco, the flamenco singing style, perhaps better known in the West. The orchestra was awarded the Israel Prize in 2006.

Ashdod also has one of the biggest open theaters in Israel - Amphi Ashdod that can hosts more than 6,400 guests. The Amphi hosts Ashdod's international art festival "Méditerranée".

The MonArt Centre for the Arts, which includes a ballet school, a music center and the Ashdod Museum of Art, is a performing arts center which comprises different galleries, art schools, studios and events. The ambitious architectural complex has been inaugurated in 2003. Theatre and concerts are hosted in several cultural venues; the most important are performed at the Ashdod Performing Arts Center, a new 938-seat concert hall of distinct elegance and originality designed by Israeli architect Haim Dotan and inaugurated in 2012 in the city's cultural center. Ashdod plays host to many national and international music festivals, including the annual Super Jazz Ashdod Festival managed by Leonid Ptashka.

The ACADMA conservatory is a professional educational institute for music and performance studies based in Ashdod. Operated under the supervision of the Ministry of Education, the institute was established in 1966, and serves as a home for 600 young musicians in different fields.

Museums
The Corinne Mamane Museum of Philistine Culture is worldwide the only museum dedicated to this topic. It reopened in 2014 with a new interactive exhibition.  The Museum displays significant Philistine artifacts form each of the five cities in the Philistine pentapolis.

The Ashdod Museum of Art, located in the MonArt center (see above at "Music and performing arts"), has 12 galleries and two exhibition halls. In an architectural echo of the Louvre, the entrance to the museum is through a glass pyramid. In 2003 the internal spaces of the museum were redesigned by the architects Eyal Weizman, Rafi Segal and Manuel Herz.

Sports 

Ashdod's football team, F.C. Ironi Ashdod represents the city in the Israeli Premier League. The club is known for its successful football school. It is also home to Hapoel Ashdod F.C., which plays in Liga Alef. The city's top basketball team is Maccabi Ashdod. The men squad plays in First League, Israel's First tier league, and the women squad Maccabi Bnot Ashdod plays in top division.

Ashdod plays host to many national and international sporting tournaments, including the annual Ashdod International Chess Festival. The city has a cricket team, a rarity in Israel. It is run and organized by citizens of Indian descent. Ashdod's beaches are a venue for water sports, like as windsurfing and Scuba diving. The Ashdod Marina offers yachting services.

Notable athletes from Ashdod include:
 Vered Borochovsky – 2000 Sydney Olympics and 2004 Summer Olympics swimmer.
 Alon Day – Professional race car driver.
 Alon Hazan – international soccer player
 Haim Revivo – international soccer player

Twin towns–Sister cities 
Ashdod is twinned with

Notable people
 Ofir Ben Shitrit (born 1995), singer
 Nir Bitton (born 1991), footballer
 Alon Day (born 1991), racing driver
 Igor Olshanetskyi (born 1986), Olympic weightlifter
 Valery Panov (born 1938), dancer and choreographer
 Dorit Revelis (born 2001), model
 Haim Revivo (born 1972), footballer
 Anna Zak (born 2001), social media star

Past
Georgy Adelson-Velsky resided in the city from 1992 until his death in 2014

See also 
 Ashdod on the Sea, Ashdod's historic twin city, now part of modern Ashdod
 Minat al-Qal'a, the Early Muslim castle at Ashdod on the Sea
 Cities of the ancient Near East
 Depopulated Palestinian locations in Israel
 Cities in the Book of Joshua

References

Bibliography

 
  
 
 
 
 
  (p.405)
 
 
 Nasser, G.A. (1955/1973):  "Memoirs" in Journal of Palestine Studies
 , pdf-file, downloadable   
  (Isdud, p.   155-158 )
 

  (Isdud: p.124 )
 Rudiger Schmitt, "Ashdod and the Material Remains of Domestic Cults in the Philistine Coastal Plain," in John Bodel and Saul M. Olyan (eds), Household and Family Religion in Antiquity (Malden, MA/Oxford: Blackwell, 2008) (The Ancient World: Comparative Histories), 159–170.

External links 

 Survey of Western Palestine, Map 16: IAA, Wikimedia commons
 
 Ashdod Port official website
 Ashdod Cemetery
Map of Ashdod region, 1960 - Eran Laor Cartographic Collection, The National Library of Israel

 
Arab villages depopulated during the 1948 Arab–Israeli War
Archaeological sites in Israel
Cities in Southern District (Israel)
Hebrew Bible cities
Mediterranean port cities and towns in Israel
Mixed communities in Mandatory Palestine
Philistine cities
Tells (archaeology)
New towns started in the 1950s